Gyan Jyoti College, is the self-financed degree college in Dagapur, on the outskirts of Siliguri, Darjeeling district. It offers undergraduate courses in arts,science and commerce. It is affiliated to the University of North Bengal.

Departments
English 
Political Science 
Journalism 
Economics 
Mass Communication 
Commerce
Finance Management

See also

References

External links
gyan jyoti college
University of North Bengal
University Grants Commission
National Assessment and Accreditation Council

Colleges affiliated to University of North Bengal
Universities and colleges in Darjeeling district
Education in Siliguri
2005 establishments in West Bengal
Educational institutions established in 2005